Pseudomopsis is a genus of hidden snout weevils in the beetle family Curculionidae. There are at least 20 described species in Pseudomopsis.

Species
These 20 species belong to the genus Pseudomopsis:

 Pseudomopsis acuratus Champion, 1905
 Pseudomopsis amoenus Hustache, 1930
 Pseudomopsis arcuatus Champion, 1905
 Pseudomopsis bicristatus Champion, 1905
 Pseudomopsis bolivianus Hustache, 1940
 Pseudomopsis conicicollis Champion, 1905
 Pseudomopsis cribricollis Hustache, 1930
 Pseudomopsis cucubano Wolcott, 1951
 Pseudomopsis distigma Champion, 1905
 Pseudomopsis dufaui Hustache, 1930
 Pseudomopsis gibbus Champion, 1910
 Pseudomopsis inflata (LeConte, 1884)
 Pseudomopsis inflatus Champion, 1905
 Pseudomopsis laticollis Champion, 1905
 Pseudomopsis latisquamis Champion, 1905
 Pseudomopsis mexicanus Hustache, 1936
 Pseudomopsis nigrosignatus Champion, 1905
 Pseudomopsis notaticollis Champion, 1905
 Pseudomopsis peckolti Costa Lima, 1945
 Pseudomopsis similis Champion, 1905

References

Further reading

 
 
 

Cryptorhynchinae
Articles created by Qbugbot